Willem Smit (born 1 August 1974) is a South African cricketer. He played in 25 first-class and 51 List A matches from 1994 to 2007.

References

External links
 

1974 births
Living people
South African cricketers
Boland cricketers
Free State cricketers